Eltingville Transit Center is a park and ride transit center that is located in Eltingville, Staten Island. It is located at the intersection of Arthur Kill Road and Richmond Avenue, at the end of the Korean War Veterans Parkway. The transit center was completed in 2004. Amenities include schedules, maps, free parking, and vending machines for soda, snacks, and MetroCards. The center is halfway between the Eltingville Staten Island Railway station and the Staten Island Mall, another (de jure) transit center, including the adjacent Yukon Depot.

History 
On December 12, 2022, the Metropolitan Transportation Authority announced that work would begin that week on a project to increase the number of spots at the center 34 percent from 437 to 586 spaces. The new spaces will be added to the west side of the existing parking lot. As part of the project, new lighting, a new curb, and new drainage systems will be installed. The project will cost $4.3 million and be completed in spring 2023.

Services
The following bus routes stop at the Eltingville Transit Center:

Local
: Staten Island Mall to Rossville via Annadale Road
: Staten Island Mall to Tottenville High School via Arden Avenue
: Port Richmond to Eltingville (with a peak extension to Tottenville)
/ Limited: St. George Ferry Terminal to Tottenville via Richmond and Arthur Kill Roads
:  Staten Island Mall to Bay Ridge via Hylan Boulevard
 Limited: 34th Street HBLR station (Bayonne, NJ) to Eltingville via Richmond Avenue

Express

: Lower Manhattan via Church Street and Broadway
: Midtown Manhattan via Fifth Avenue and Sixth Avenue
: Lower Manhattan via Church Street and Broadway
: Midtown Manhattan via Fifth Avenue and Madison Ave
: Lower Manhattan via Water Street
: Midtown Manhattan via Lexington Avenue and Madison Avenue
: Union Square via Sixth Avenue, Broadway, and West Street
: Midtown Manhattan via New Jersey and 42nd Street
: Midtown Manhattan via Fifth Avenue and Sixth Avenue
: Lower Manhattan Downtown Loop via Church Street and Water Street
: Midtown Manhattan via New Jersey and 42nd Street
: Midtown Manhattan via Fifth Avenue and Madison Avenue

References

External links

Staten Island Bus Schedules

Transportation buildings and structures in Staten Island
Bus stations in New York City
MTA Regional Bus Operations
Transit centers in the United States
Transportation in Staten Island
2004 establishments in New York City